Ut-napishtim or Uta-na’ishtim (in the Epic of Gilgamesh), Atra-Hasis, Ziusudra (Sumerian), Xisuthros (Ξίσουθρος, in Berossus) is a character in ancient Mesopotamian mythology. He is tasked by the god Enki (Akkadian: Ea) to create a giant ship to be called Preserver of Life in preparation of a giant flood that would wipe out all life. The character appears in the Epic of Gilgamesh.

Story 

Ut-napishtim is tasked by the god Enki to abandon his worldly possessions and create a giant ship to be called Preserver of Life. In Erra and Išum, Marduk is said to have been the originator of the flood and the Seven Sages. 

The Preserver of Life was made of solid timber, so that the rays of Shamash (the sun) would not shine in, and of equal dimensions in length and width. The design of the ship was supposedly drawn on the ground by Enki, and the frame of the ark, which was made in five days, was 200 feet in length, width and height, with a floor-space of one acre. The ark interior had seven floors, each floor divided into 9 sections, finishing the ark fully on the seventh day. The entrance to the ship was sealed once everyone had boarded the ship.

He was also tasked with bringing his wife, family, and relatives along with the craftsmen of his village, baby animals, and grains. The oncoming flood would wipe out all animals and people not on the ship. After twelve days on the water, Utnapishtim opened the hatch of his ship to look around and saw the slopes of Mount Nisir, where he rested his ship for seven days. On the seventh day, he sent a dove out to see if the water had receded, and the dove could find nothing but water, so it returned. Then he sent out a swallow, and just as before, it returned, having found nothing. Finally, Utnapishtim sent out a raven, and the raven saw that the waters had receded, so it circled around, but did not return. Utnapishtim then set all the animals free, and made a sacrifice to the gods. 

The gods came, and because he had preserved the seed of man while remaining loyal and trusting of his gods, Utnapishtim and his wife were given immortality, as well as a place among the heavenly gods. Enki (Ea) also claims that he did not tell "Atrahasis" (apparently referring to Utnapishtim) about the flood, but rather that he only made a dream appear to him.

Role in the epic 
In the epic, overcome with the death of his friend Enkidu, the hero Gilgamesh sets out on a series of journeys to search for his ancestor Utnapishtim (Xisouthros) who lives at the mouth of the rivers and has been given eternal life. 

Utnapishtim counsels Gilgamesh to abandon his search for immortality, but gives him a trial to defy sleep if he wishes to obtain immortality. Gilgamesh failing at his trial to defy sleep, Utnapishtim next tells him about a plant that can make him young again. Gilgamesh obtains the plant from the bottom of the sea in Dilmun (often considered to be current-day Bahrain) but a serpent steals it, and Gilgamesh returns home to the city of Uruk, having abandoned hope of either immortality or renewed youth.

See also
Atra-Hasis
Deucalion
Flood myth
Noah
Ziusudra

References

Epic of Gilgamesh
Flood myths
Mythological characters